The 1936 season of the Primera División Unificada, was a promotion championship that was played in a single season in 1936. It was the second category in tournaments in Peru in that year and granted two promotions to the 1937 Peruvian Primera División.

The tournament had 6 teams from Lima and 6 from Callao. The results of a reserve teams league were added as bonus points.

Results

Standings

External links
Peru 1937 season at RSSSF
Peruvian Football League News

References

Peru1
Peruvian Primera División seasons
1937 in Peruvian football